Adrian Boucher (–1804)  was a French architect who came to prominence after emigrating to the United States in the late 18th century. He was considered amongst the top European talent involved in the construction of post-colonial America, and became the first architect to work in Savannah, Georgia.

Life and career 
Boucher was born in France around 1760. He left his homeland for the United States, in the late 18th century, as a refugee of the French Revolution. He arrived in New York City, where he worked as a draftsman for noted architect brothers and his compatriots Joseph-François and Charles Mangin.

In 1799, one of Boucher's works, the City Exchange, in Savannah, Georgia, was completed. He had arrived in the city to assist in its reconstruction after the 1796 fire and became one of the early influencers of the growth of the city, along with cartographer John William Gerard de Brahm.

Boucher designed the second of three incarnations of Savannah's Christ Church, the construction of which began in 1801 but was leveled during the 1804 Antigua–Charleston hurricane.

He was included on 1799 and 1802 lists of defaulters in Chatham County.

Death 
Boucher died in 1804, aged around 44.

References 

1760 births
1804 deaths
18th-century French architects
19th-century French architects